Linacre is a Metropolitan Borough of Sefton ward in the Bootle Parliamentary constituency that covers the area of the town of Bootle historically known as Linacre and which contains Bootle centre, the New Strand Shopping Centre, and Gladstone Dock. The ward population taken at the 2011 census was 12,305.

Etymology
The name Linacre derives from Middle English līn ('flax') and aker ('field'), thus once denoting a place associated with a flax-field.

Councillors

Election results

Elections of the 2010s

References

Wards of the Metropolitan Borough of Sefton